Merluccius albidus, sometimes known as the offshore hake, offshore silver hake, or offshore whiting, is a species of fish in the family Merlucciidae.

References

albidus
Fish of the Atlantic Ocean
Fish described in 1818
Taxa named by Samuel L. Mitchill